is a Japanese photographer who's work has been featured at Tokyo Photographic Art Museum.

References

External links
Nihon shashinka jiten / 328 Outstanding Japanese Photographers. Kyoto: Tankōsha, 2000. . 
''Graduated from Nihon University Buzan High school in 1967,and Nihon University Faculty of Animal Husbandry in 1971.

Japanese photographers
1949 births
Living people
Place of birth missing (living people)
Date of birth missing (living people)
20th-century Japanese photographers